In measure theory, or at least in the approach to it via the domain theory, a valuation is a map from the class of open sets of a topological space to the set of positive real numbers including infinity, with certain properties. It is a concept closely related to that of a measure, and as such, it finds applications in measure theory, probability theory, and theoretical computer science.

Domain/Measure theory definition
Let  be a topological space: a valuation is any set function

satisfying the following three properties

The definition immediately shows the relationship between a valuation and a measure: the properties of the two mathematical object are often very similar if not identical, the only difference being that the domain of a measure is the Borel algebra of the given topological space, while the domain of a valuation is the class of open sets.

Continuous valuation
A valuation (as defined in domain theory/measure theory) is said to be continuous if for every directed family  of open sets (i.e. an indexed family of open sets which is also directed in the sense that for each pair of indexes  and  belonging to the index set , there exists an index  such that  and ) the following equality holds:

This property is analogous to the τ-additivity of measures.

Simple valuation
A valuation (as defined in domain theory/measure theory) is said to be simple if it is a finite linear combination with non-negative coefficients of Dirac valuations, that is,

where  is always greater than or at least equal to zero for all index . Simple valuations are obviously continuous in the above sense. The supremum of a directed family of simple valuations (i.e. an indexed family of simple valuations which is also directed in the sense that for each pair of indexes  and  belonging to the index set , there exists an index  such that  and ) is called quasi-simple valuation

See also
 The concepts of valuation on convex sets and valuation on manifolds are a generalization of valuation in the sense of domain/measure theory. A valuation on convex sets is allowed to assume complex values, and the underlying topological space is the set of non-empty convex compact subsets of a finite-dimensional vector space: a valuation on manifolds is a complex valued finitely additive measure defined on a proper subset of the class of all compact submanifolds of the given manifolds.

Examples

Dirac valuation
Let  be a topological space, and let  be a point of : the map

is a valuation in the domain theory/measure theory, sense called Dirac valuation. This concept bears its origin from distribution theory as it is an obvious transposition to valuation theory of Dirac distribution: as seen above, Dirac valuations are the "bricks" simple valuations are made of.

See also

Notes

Works cited

.

External links

 Alesker, Semyon, "various preprints on valuation s", arXiv preprint server, primary site at Cornell University. Several papers dealing with valuations on convex sets, valuations on manifolds and related topics.
 The nLab page on valuations

Measure theory